Cueva del Indio may refer to:
 Cueva del Indio (Las Piedras), a cave located in Las Piedras, Puerto Rico
 Cueva del Indio (Arecibo), a cave located in Arecibo, Puerto Rico

See also
 Cueva de Los Indios,  Loiza, Puerto Rico